Mikael Yann Mathieu Mandron (born 11 October 1994) is a French professional footballer who plays as a striker for Motherwell of the Scottish Premiership.

Mandron joined the Academy at Sunderland from the French lower leagues in the summer of 2011. He completed his two-year scholarship before making his Premier League debut in April 2013. He joined League Two side Fleetwood Town on loan in 2014 and spent time on loan at fellow League Two club Shrewsbury Town in 2015. He had a final loan at Hartlepool United in late 2015 before being released by Sunderland in summer 2016. 

He signed for National League side Eastleigh, where his performances earned the attention of Championship club Wigan Athletic, signing in January 2017. He then signed for League Two club Colchester United in July 2017. He made 95 appearances for Colchester before his release in summer 2019, then spent a season at Gillingham and two seasons at Crewe Alexandra.

Club career

Sunderland
Born in Boulogne-sur-Mer, France, Mandron attended the Clairefontaine Academy like compatriots Thierry Henry and Nicolas Anelka. He came through the youth ranks at Boulogne-Billancourt, for whom he had played since the age of seven. He joined Sunderland's Academy in the summer of 2011 at the age of 16 for his two-year scholarship.

Following an injury to Steven Fletcher, Mandron was called into training with the first team in March 2013. On 29 April, Mandron made his professional debut against Aston Villa, coming on as an 85th-minute substitute and replacing Danny Graham in a 6–1 defeat.

With first-team opportunities limited at Sunderland, on 7 January 2014 Mandron agreed to join League Two club Fleetwood Town until the end of the season. He made his debut on 11 January in a 1–0 win over Dagenham & Redbridge. He then scored his first professional goal on 1 February 2014, in a 2–1 loss to York City. He went on to make 13 appearances before returning to his parent club in March 2014.

On 28 January 2015, Mandron signed on a youth loan for League Two side Shrewsbury Town until the end of the season. He made his Shrewsbury debut three days later, in a 1–0 win over Newport County. He made three appearances for the club.

On 13 November 2015, Mandron joined League Two side Hartlepool United on loan until 2 January 2016. He made his Hartlepool debut against Leyton Orient on 15 November in a 3–1 win. He scored his second career goal on 15 December in Hartlepool's FA Cup second round replay against Salford City. He scored in the 120th-minute of the game after the match ended 0–0. After picking up a groin strain, Hartlepool ended his loan early in late December after the striker had scored one goal in seven appearances.

Sunderland announced in April 2016 that Mandron would be one of four players to be released at the end of the season on the expiry of his contract.

Eastleigh
National League side Eastleigh signed Mandron on a two-year contract on 14 June 2016 following his release by Sunderland. He had previously been linked with a move to Scottish Premiership side Partick Thistle. He made his Eastleigh debut on 6 August, starting in their 2–1 win against Guiseley before being replaced in the 84th minute. He scored his first goals for the club on 29 August with a hat-trick against Bromley. After scoring 15 goals in 33 games for Eastleigh, he was linked with a move back to the English Football League after Championship side Wigan Athletic had an undisclosed offer accepted by Eastleigh.

Wigan Athletic
On 31 January 2017, Wigan Athletic signed Mandron on a -year contract for an undisclosed fee. He came off the bench to make his Wigan debut on 21 February in their 2–1 defeat at Queens Park Rangers. He made one start and two substitute appearances before the end of the campaign.

Colchester United
After making only three appearances for Wigan, Mandron moved to League Two club Colchester United for an undisclosed fee on 21 July 2017, signing a two-year contract. He made his Colchester debut on 5 August in their 3–1 defeat at Accrington Stanley. He scored his first Colchester goal on 12 August with the equaliser in a 1–1 draw with Stevenage. He was sent off for the first time in his professional career when he handled the ball in the penalty area during Colchester's 3–1 defeat at Cheltenham Town on 16 September. He was named in the 'EFL Team of the Week' after scoring two goals against Crewe Alexandra which brought his tally to four goals in his last five games. He was nominated for the EFL League Two Player of the Month award after scoring four goals in five games during the month of October.

Gillingham
On the expiry of his contract in summer 2019, Mandron was released by Colchester United, and subsequently joined Gillingham. He scored his first goal for Gillingham in an EFL Trophy tie against former club Colchester United on 3 September 2019. He scored six goals during the 2019–20 season, including a brace at former club Sunderland on 7 March 2020 in what would be the last game the Kent side played before the season was curtailed due to the Coronavirus pandemic.

Crewe Alexandra
Mandron joined Crewe Alexandra in August 2020 on a 12-month contract, and made his Crewe debut in a 1–2 defeat by Lincoln City in the first round of the EFL Cup at Gresty Road on 5 September. He scored his first two Crewe goals in the next fixture, a 3–2 victory at Bolton Wanderers in an EFL Trophy group game on 8 September 2020. In February 2021, Mandron signed a contract through to the summer of 2022. He scored twice in Crewe's final game of the season, a 3–2 win over Shrewsbury Town at Gresty Road, taking his season's tally in all competitions to 14, and making him Crewe's top scorer of the 2020–21 season.

Crewe struggled the following season but Mandron was again the club's leading scorer, with nine goals in all competitions, before incurring a knee injury against Gillingham at Priestfield on 1 February 2022, potentially sidelining him for "an extended period", though a subsequent scan proved it to be less serious than initially feared. He finished the season as joint top scorer, with 10 goals (level with Chris Long), but following Crewe's relegation to League Two, Mandron confirmed in May 2022 that he would not be extending his contract at the club.

Gillingham
Mandron returned to Gillingham on 11 July 2022. He scored the first goal of his second spell with the club in a EFL Cup fixture against AFC Wimbledon on 9 August 2022. In the third round of the same competition Mandron scored an equalising header and in the penalty shootout as Gillingham knocked out Premier League side Brentford, helping the Kent side to reach the fourth round of the competition for the first time since 1996.

Motherwell
In January 2023, Mandron agreed to the termination of his contract with Gillingham and shortly afterwards signed for Motherwell of the Scottish Premiership.  He scored his first two goals for the club in a Scottish Cup victory away to Arbroath.

International career
Eligible to represent England, France, and Scotland at international level, Mandron was called up to the Scotland under-20 team in May 2013. He qualifies to play for Scotland through an Aberdeen-born grandparent.

Style of play
Possessing a big physique, striker Mandron uses this trait to back into defenders, collect the ball by dropping deeper into the midfield, and hold the ball up, with the ability to win headers from set-plays.

Personal life
Mandron supported Real Madrid when growing up, while he also followed the results of Paris Saint-Germain.

Career statistics

References

External links

1994 births
Living people
People from Boulogne-sur-Mer
Sportspeople from Pas-de-Calais
French footballers
Association football forwards
Sunderland A.F.C. players
Fleetwood Town F.C. players
Shrewsbury Town F.C. players
Hartlepool United F.C. players
Eastleigh F.C. players
Wigan Athletic F.C. players
Colchester United F.C. players
Gillingham F.C. players
Crewe Alexandra F.C. players
Motherwell F.C. players
Premier League players
English Football League players
National League (English football) players
French expatriate footballers
French expatriate sportspeople in England
French people of Scottish descent
Footballers from Hauts-de-France
French expatriate sportspeople in Scotland
Expatriate footballers in Scotland